Abuna Yosef (Amharic: አቡነ ዮሴፍ) is a prominent mountain in the Lasta massif of the Ethiopian Highlands. At  it is the 6th tallest mountain in Ethiopia and the 19th highest of Africa. It is located in the Semien Wollo Zone of the Amhara Region.

Afro-alpine environment
The Abuna Yosef massif is home to Ethiopian wolves, Gelada baboons Erica arborea, Lobelia and other afro-alpine vegetation.

The Abuna Yosef Community Conservation Area covers about 70 km of the Abuna Yosef massif.   Asheten eco trekking +251910879046

Major towns
At the eastern part of the mountain range, the town of Wandatch (on the Kobo - Lalibela road) is the main entry point to the Abuna Yosef afro-alpine massif. At 3500 m above sea level, it is one of the most elevated towns in Ethiopia.

The towns of Muja, Kulmesq and Lalibela are located on the footslopes of the massif.

Monolithic churches on the footslopes
A notable landmark on this mountain is the Church of Gennete Maryam, a monolithic church which tradition reports was excavated during the reign of Yekuno Amlak. Also notable are four free-standing churches build inside caves in the mountain, the oldest and most famous being Yemrehana Krestos Church, built by the Zagwe king of the same name. The other three are Emakina Medhane Alem (probably built by Yekuno Amlak in the late 13th century), Lidetta Maryam, and Zammadu Maryam (probably 15th century). The churches of Lalibela lie in its foothills.

See also 
 List of Ultras of Africa (ultra prominent peaks)

References

External links
 The Abune Yosef Massif: Birds and Mammals of a Hidden Jewel of Ethiopia. Universitat de Barcelona. 2009.

Abuna Yosef
Amhara Region